In phonology, hiatus, diaeresis, or dieresis describes the occurrence of two separate vowel sounds in adjacent syllables with no intervening consonant. When two vowel sounds instead occur together as part of a single syllable, the result is called a diphthong.

Preference
Some languages do not have diphthongs, except sometimes in rapid speech, or they have a limited number of diphthongs but also numerous vowel sequences that cannot form diphthongs and so appear in hiatus. That is the case of Japanese, Nuosu, Bantu languages like Swahili, and Lakota. Examples are Japanese  'blue/green', and Swahili  'purify', both with three syllables.

Avoidance
Many languages disallow or restrict hiatus and avoid it by deleting or assimilating the vowel or by adding an extra consonant.

Epenthesis

A consonant may be added between vowels (epenthesis) to prevent hiatus. That is most often a semivowel or a glottal, but all kinds of other consonants can be used as well, depending on the language and the quality of the two adjacent vowels. For example, some non-rhotic dialects of English often insert  to avoid hiatus after non-high word-final or occasionally morpheme-final vowels.

Contraction
In Greek and Latin poetry, hiatus is generally avoided although it occurs in many authors under certain rules, with varying degrees of poetic licence. Hiatus may be avoided by elision of a final vowel, occasionally prodelision (elision of initial vowel), synizesis (pronunciation of two vowels as one without a change in spelling), or contractions such as αει->ᾷ.

Marking

Diaeresis

In Dutch and French, the second of two vowels in hiatus is marked with a diacritic (or ) if otherwise that combination could be interpreted as a diphthong or as having one of the vowels silent. Examples are the Dutch word poëzie ("poetry") and the French word ambiguë (feminine form of ambigu, "ambiguous"). This usage is occasionally seen in English (such as coöperate, daïs and reëlect) but has never been common, and over the last century, its use in such words has been dropped or replaced by the use of a hyphen except in a very few publications, notably The New Yorker. It is, however, still sometimes seen in loanwords such as naïve and Noël and in the proper names Zoë and Chloë.

Other ways
In German, hiatus between monophthongs is usually written with an intervening h, as in   "to pull";   "to threaten". In a few words (such as ), the h represents a consonant that has become silent, but in most cases, it was added later simply to indicate the end of the stem.

Similarly, in Scottish Gaelic, hiatus is written by a number of digraphs: . Some examples include   "river";   "day";   "condition". The convention goes back to the Old Irish scribal tradition, but it is more consistently applied in Scottish Gaelic:  (> ). However, hiatus in Old Irish was usually simply implied in certain vowel digraphs  (> ),  (> ).

Correption
Correption is the shortening of a long vowel before a short vowel in hiatus.

See also
 Diphthong
 Synaeresis
 Elision
 Movable nu

References

Phonetics
Vowels

Further reading